Kaif Bhopali (20 February 1920 – 24 July 1991) was an Indian Urdu poet and lyricist. He was a poet in the Urdu mushaira circles, and is known as the writer of songs like Chalo Dildar Chalo, sung by Mohd. Rafi in Kamal Amrohi's 1972 classic, Pakeezah.

Career
Kaif Bhoopali wrote lyrics for many Bollywood films like Pakeezah (1972), where he wrote songs like Teer-E-Nazar and Chalo dildar chalo chand ke paar chalo.

He also wrote some ghazals like "तेरा चेहरा कितना सुहाना लगता है", Jhoom ke jab rindon ne pila de, sung by Jagjit Singh. Another song was Aye Khuda Shukr Tera in the 1983 film Razia Sultan, written and directed by Kamal Amrohi.Apne aap raaton mein, sung by Lata Mangeshkar is a gem from 1977 film Shankar Hussain.Kaif Bhopali's daughter, Parveen Kaif, is a poet who participates in mushairas.

Filmography
 Pakeezah (1972)
 Shankar Hussain (1977)
 Raziya Sultan (1983)

References

External links
 
 Works of Kaif Bhopali

Urdu-language lyricists
Indian male composers
20th-century Indian Muslims
Writers from Bhopal
Urdu-language poets from India
20th-century Indian composers
Poets from Madhya Pradesh
Musicians from Madhya Pradesh
Indian lyricists
20th-century male musicians
1917 births
1991 deaths